HAT-P-5 is a 12th magnitude star in the constellation Lyra, approximately 1,000 light years away from Earth. It is a spectral type G star, about 1.16 solar masses and radii greater than the Sun, and only 200 kelvins hotter. It is estimated to be 2.6 billion years old.

The star HAT-P-5 is named Chasoň. The name was selected in the NameExoWorlds campaign by Slovakia, during the 100th anniversary of the IAU. Chasoň is an ancient Slovak term for Sun.

Planetary system
On October 9, 2007, a report was submitted to The Astrophysical Journal Letters telling of the discovery of an exoplanet transiting HAT-P-5. The planet was described as a Jupiter-like hot Jupiter, with a radius about one and one quarter times that of Jupiter, and nearly the same mass. Its density was reported as 0.66 ± 0.11 g/cm3, and its inclination 86.75 ± 0.44°.

See also
 HAT-P-4
 HAT-P-6
 List of extrasolar planets

References

External links
 HAT-P-5 light curve using differential photometry

G-type main-sequence stars
Planetary transit variables
Lyra (constellation)
Planetary systems with one confirmed planet